, provisional designation , is a classical trans-Neptunian object and dwarf planet candidate from the Kuiper belt, located in the outermost region of the Solar System, approximately  in diameter. The cubewano belongs to the hot population. It was discovered on 26 July 2011, by astronomers with the Pan-STARRS survey at Haleakala Observatory, Hawaii, United States.

Orbit and classification 

 orbits the Sun at a distance of 39.1–44.3 AU once every 269 years and 1 month (98,276 days; semi-major axis of 41.68 AU). Its orbit has an eccentricity of 0.06 and an inclination of 23° with respect to the ecliptic.

As a cubewano, also known as classical Kuiper belt object, it is located in between the resonant plutino and twotino populations and has a low-eccentricity orbit. With an inclination above 8°, it belongs to the "stirred" hot population rather than to the cold population with low inclinations. The body's observation arc begins with its official discovery observation in July 2011 at Haleakala Observatory.

Numbering and naming 

This object received the number  in the minor planet catalog. As of 2018, it has not been named.

Physical characteristics 

According to the American astronomer Michael Brown,  measures 343 kilometers in diameter based on an assumed albedo of 0.08. On his website, Brown lists this object as a "possible" dwarf planet (200–400 km), which is the category with the lowest certainty in his 5-class taxonomic system. Similarly, Johnston's archive estimates a diameter 336 kilometers using an albedo of 0.09.

As of 2018, no spectroscopic or photometric observations have been made. The body's spectral type, color indices, rotation period, pole and shape remain unknown.

References

External links 
 List of Transneptunian Objects, Minor Planet Center
 M.P.E.C. statistics for F51 – All MPECs
 Discovery Circumstances: Numbered Minor Planets (520001)-(525000) – Minor Planet Center
 
 

523674
523674
523674
20110726